The Metropolitan Police was the police force under the authority of the Autonomous City of Buenos Aires until it merged with the city's division of the Argentine Federal Police by creating the Buenos Aires City Police in 2017. The force was created in 2010 and is composed of 1,850 officers, and is planned to expand to 16,000. Security in the city was concurrently the responsibility of the Metropolitan Police and the Argentine Federal Police. 

The city government claims the force was based on the model of the British London Metropolitan Police and the New York Police Department. The force was intended to used high technology support and adopted a policy of zero tolerance.

Structure and organization of the Metropolitan Police

The police was headed by a chief and a deputy chief. Both were appointed by the head of the executive branch of the city. There were four major departments, each headed by a director general:
 Public Security
 Investigations and Research
 Scientific and Technical
 Administration 

Geographically, the force was divided into 15 precincts.

Of the 1,850 officers, 900 were used for patrolling the streets.

Ranks
The Metropolitan Police used nine ranks, the highest being "Superintendent".
 Officer 
 Senior Officer
 Sub-Inspector
 Inspector
 Sub-Commissioner
 Commissioner
 Senior Commissioner
 Commissioner-General
 Superintendent

Controversy
A lot of controversies surrounded Buenos Aires Metropolitan Police BAMP officers, primarily due to the department's "zero-tolerance" policy: many officers used to be violent against protesters and used excessive force. However, the department has managed to boost its reputation. However, the public opinion was more positive about the Metropolitan Police than Argentine Federal Police, and citizens tended to choose the Metropolitan Police over the Federal Police, due to high levels of corruption in the latter.

Notes

See also
 Metropolitan Police
 Guardia Urbana de Buenos Aires
 Argentine Federal Police
 Buenos Aires Police
 Santa Fe Province Police
 Interior Security System

External links
 Official website (archived, 28 Nov 2016)

Municipal law enforcement agencies of Argentina
2008 establishments in Argentina
2017 disestablishments in Argentina
Buenos Aires